The Post and Logistics Union (PAU) is a trade union, principally representing postal workers, in Finland.

The union was founded on 1 June 2005, when the Postal Union merged with the Postal Officers' Union.  The two unions, originally representing separate groups of workers, and affiliated to different union federations, had increasingly come to co-operate.  The new union chose to affiliate to the Central Organisation of Finnish Trade Unions.

By 2007, the union represented 82% of eligible workers in the postal service, with approximately half the members being women.  As of 2020, the union had 25,004 members.

Presidents
2005: Esa Vilkuna
2014: Heidi Nieminen

References

Postal trade unions
Trade unions in Finland
Trade unions established in 2005